Robert Alan Alexander (April 21, 1958 – June 7, 2022) was an American football running back who played collegiately for the West Virginia Mountaineers.

Collegiate career
Alexander's career began at South Charleston High School, where he was the high school football national player of the year his senior season as picked by Parade Magazine. He then attended West Virginia over USC, Penn State, Ohio State and Maryland. On his freshman campaign, Alexander shared backup time with Walter Easley, behind starting back Dave Riley. Alexander rushed for 426 yards and a touchdown his freshman year.

Alexander shared starting time his sophomore year with Dane Conwell, a freshman, in 1978. Alexander, although sharing carries, rushed for 310 yards, third on the team.

In 1979, Alexander's junior season, he finally became the full starter of the Mountaineers' squad. Alexander rushed for 656 yards and two scores that season, which was the best of his career.

Alexander's best season came in 1980, his final year. Alexander rushed for a career-high and team-high 1,064 yards along with 5 touchdowns that season. At the time, the 4th most yards in a single season in Mountaineer history. At the time he left WVU Alexander ranked 2nd on the schools career rushing yards list.

Alexander is currently ranked 10th on the Mountaineers' all-time rushing yardage list with a career total of 2,474 yards rushing.

Professional career
Alexander was drafted in the tenth round of the 1981 NFL Draft by the Los Angeles Rams and played for them for two seasons.

Death 
On June 7, 2022, Alexander was found dead in his St. Albans, West Virginia, home. There were no signs of foul play.

References

1958 births
2022 deaths
20th-century African-American sportspeople
African-American players of American football
American football running backs
Los Angeles Rams players
People from South Charleston, West Virginia
Players of American football from West Virginia
South Charleston High School alumni
West Virginia Mountaineers football players
People from St. Albans, West Virginia